Adult books may refer to:

Fiction aimed at adults
Erotic literature
Adult Books (band), a post-punk band from Los Angeles
"Adult Books", a 1978 song by X

See also
Sex shop, sometimes called an adult book store